Panolopus curtissi, also known commonly as Curtiss' galliwasp, Curtis's galliwasp, and the Hispaniolan khaki galliwasp, is a species of lizard in the family Diploglossidae endemic to the island of Hispaniola and surrounding islets.

Taxonomy
It was formerly classified in the genus Celestus, but was moved to Panolopus in 2021.

Etymology
The specific name, curtissi, is in honor of American naturalist Anthony Curtiss.

Geographic range
P. curtissi is found in the Dominican Republic and Haiti.

Habitat

Description

Reproduction
P. curtissi is viviparous (ovoviviparous). Litter size is 2–5.

Subspecies
Four subspecies are recognized as being valid, including the nominotypical subspecies.
Panolopus curtissi aporus 
Panolopus curtissi curtissi 
Panolopus curtissi diastatus 
Panolopus curtissi hylonomus

References

Further reading
Grant C (1951). "The Specific Characters of the Celesti, with the Description of a New Species of Celestus (Sauria, Anguidae)". Copeia 1951 (1): 67–69. (Celestus curtissi, new species).
Schools M, Hedges SB (2021). "Phylogenetics, classification, and biogeography of the Neotropical forest lizards (Squamata, Diploglossidae)". Zootaxa 4974 (2): 201–257. (Panolopus curtissi, new combination).
Schwartz A (1964). "Diploglossus costatus Cope (Sauria: Anguidae) and its relatives in Hispaniola". Reading Public Museum and Art Gallery, Scientific Publications (13): 1–57. (Diploglossus curtissi, new combination, p. 39; D. c. aporus, new subspecies, p. 45; D. c. diastatus, new subspecies, p. 42; D. c. hylonomus, new subspecies, p. 49).
Schwartz A, Henderson RW (1991). Amphibians and Reptiles of the West Indies: Descriptions, Distributions, and Natural History. Gainesville: University of Florida Press. 720 pp. . (Celestus curtissi, p. 371).
Schwartz A, Thomas R (1975). A Check-list of West Indian Amphibians and Reptiles. Carnegie Museum of Natural History Special Publication No. 1. Pittsburgh, Pennsylvania: Carnegie Museum of Natural History. 216 pp. (Diploglossus curtissi, pp. 117–118).

Panolopus
Reptiles described in 1951
Endemic fauna of Hispaniola
Taxa named by Chapman Grant